Dương Thị Việt Anh (born 30 December 1989) is a Vietnamese athlete competing in the high jump. She competed at the 2012 Summer Olympics.

International competitions

References

External links
 

1989 births
Living people
Vietnamese female high jumpers
Olympic athletes of Vietnam
Athletes (track and field) at the 2012 Summer Olympics
Athletes (track and field) at the 2018 Asian Games
Southeast Asian Games medalists in athletics
Southeast Asian Games gold medalists for Vietnam
Southeast Asian Games bronze medalists for Vietnam
Competitors at the 2009 Southeast Asian Games
Competitors at the 2011 Southeast Asian Games
Competitors at the 2013 Southeast Asian Games
Competitors at the 2017 Southeast Asian Games
Asian Games competitors for Vietnam
People from Bạc Liêu Province
Olympic female high jumpers
21st-century Vietnamese women
20th-century Vietnamese women